Mainz Nord station is a railway station in the municipality of Mainz, Rhineland-Palatinate, Germany. It is adjacent to Schott AG, Römheld & Moelle and Werner & Mertz.

References

Nord
Buildings and structures in Mainz